Alfred James Mitchell (19 January 1853 – 18 August 1928) was a New Zealand police superintendent. He was born in Plymouth, Devonshire, England on 19 January 1853.

References

1853 births
1928 deaths
New Zealand police officers